Pruinescence , or pruinosity, is a "frosted" or dusty-looking coating on top of a surface. It may also be called a pruina (plural: pruinae), from the Latin word for hoarfrost. The adjectival form is pruinose .

Entomology
In insects, a "bloom" caused by wax particles on top of an insect's cuticle covers up the underlying coloration, giving a dusty or frosted appearance. The pruinescence is commonly white to pale blue in color but can be gray, pink, purple, or red; these colors may be produced by Tyndall scattering of light. When pale in color, pruinescence often strongly reflects ultraviolet.

Pruinescence is found in many species of Odonata, particularly damselflies of the families Lestidae and Coenagrionidae, where it occurs on the wings and body. Among true dragonflies it is most common on male Libellulidae (skimmers).

In the common whitetail and blue dasher dragonflies (Plathemis lydia and Pachydiplax longipennis), males display the pruinescence on the back of the abdomen to other males as a territorial threat.  Other Odonata may use pruinescence to recognize members of their own species or to cool their bodies by reflecting radiation away.

Plants, fungi, and lichens
The term pruinosity is also applied to "blooms" on plants—for example, on the skin of grapes—and to powderings on the cap and stem of mushrooms, which can be important for identification.

An epinecral layer is "a layer of horny dead fungal hyphae with indistinct lumina in or near the cortex above the algal layer".

References

Insect morphology
Plant morphology